Parewadanda  is a village development committee in Lamjung District in the Gandaki Zone of northern-central Nepal. At the time of the 1991 Nepal census it had a population of 2633 people living in 528 individual households.

The major castes of the VDC are mainly Brahmins, Chhetris, Kamis, and Kumals. Major goddesses are Jibjibe Kalika and Manakamana.

References

External links
UN map of the municipalities of Lamjung District

Populated places in Lamjung District